The Mealagh Valley is located just outside the town of Bantry, in the south-west of Ireland. It has one school. The Mealagh Valley is noted for its many Celtic monuments such as ringforts, tombs and standing stones. The Mealagh Valley is about 1.5 hours from Cork Airport. The Mealagh River runs through the centre of the valley with the Mealach Beag (Irish, English translation: Small Mealagh), its only tributary. Mealach is Irish for Honey as it has a large amount of wild bees in its environs.

Landforms of County Cork
Valleys of the Republic of Ireland